Mitragynine is an indole-based alkaloid and the most abundant active alkaloid in the Southeast Asian plant Mitragyna speciosa, commonly known as kratom. The total alkaloid concentration in dried leaves ranges from 0.5 to 1.5%. In Thai varieties, mitragynine is the most abundant component (up to 66% of total alkaloids) while 7-hydroxymitragynine is a minor constituent (up to 2% of total alkaloid content). In Malaysian kratom varieties, mitragynine is present at lower concentration (12% of total alkaloids). Such preparations are orally consumed and typically involve dried kratom leaves which are brewed into tea or ground and placed into capsules. Mitragynine consumption for medicinal and recreation purposes dates back centuries, although early use was primarily limited to Southeast Asian countries such as Indonesia and Thailand where the plant grows indigenously. Recently, mitragynine use has spread throughout Europe and the Americas as both a recreational and medicinal drug. While research into the effects of kratom have begun to emerge, investigations on the active compound mitragynine are less common.

Uses

Medical  
, the United States Food and Drug Administration (FDA) had stated that there were no approved clinical uses for kratom, and that there was no evidence that kratom was safe or effective for treating any condition. This reiterated the conclusion of an earlier report by the European Monitoring Centre for Drugs and Drug Addiction (EMCDDA): , kratom had not been approved for any medical use. , the FDA had noted, in particular, that there had been no clinical trials to study safety and efficacy of kratom in the treatment of opioid addiction. , the United States Drug Enforcement Administration had, as well, stated, "There is no legitimate medical use for kratom".

Ethnopharmacology

Antinociception 
Mitragynine-containing kratom extracts, with their accompanying array of alkaloids and other natural products, have been used for their perceived pain-mitigation (i.e., antinociception) properties for at least a century. In Southeast Asia, the consumption of mitragynine from whole leaf kratom preparations is common among laborers who report utilizing kratom's mild stimulant and perceived antinociceptive properties to increase endurance and ease pain while working. In one laboratory study in a rat model in 2016, alkaloid-containing extracts of kratom gave evidence of inducing naloxone-reversible antinociceptive effects in hotplate and tail-flick tests to a level comparable to oxycodone.

Chronic pain 
Kratom is commonly used in the United States as self-treatment for pain and opioid withdrawal. A 2019 review of existing literature suggested the potential of kratom as substitution therapy for chronic pain.

Opioid withdrawal 
As early as the 19th century, mitragynine ingested  via kratom leaves was reportedly in use for the treatment of opium addiction and withdrawal. , review of mental health aspects of kratom use mention opioid replacement and withdrawal as a primary motivations for kratom use: almost 50% of the approximately 8,000 kratom users surveyed in one study indicated kratom use that resulted in reduced or discontinued use of opioids. Some animal models of opioid withdrawals suggest mitragynine can suppress and ameliorate withdrawal from other opioid agonists, e.g., after chronic administration of morphine in zebra fish.

Recreational 
Mitragynine and its metabolite 7-hydroxymitragynine are thought to underlie the effects of kratom. Consumption of dried kratom leaves yields different responses depending on the dose consumed. At low doses, the plant is reported to induce a mild stimulating effect, while larger doses are reported to produce sedation and antinociception typical of opioids. The concentration of mitragynine and other alkaloids in kratom have been found to vary between particular strains of the plant, thus indicating strain-specific effects from consumption, as well. Kratom extracts are often mixed with other easily attainable psychoactive compounds—such are found in over-the-counter cough medicines—to potentiate the effects of the concentrated levels of mitragynine. Adverse effects associated with the consumption of mitragynine-containing preparations from M. speciosa include a negative impact on cognition; moreover, the potential for misuse of mitragynine and related alkaloids has been documented in animal studies, including through the use of the conditioned place preference (CPP) test, which indicated a distinct reward-effect for 7-hydroxymitragynine.

Dependence and withdrawal 
Due to its activity on opioid receptors, mitragynine itself can result in dependence and lead to withdrawal symptoms when discontinued. Regular users report withdrawal symptoms comparable to that of other opioids following the discontinuation of kratom. A 2014 study which included 1118 male kratom users indicated that more than half of the regular users (67% of total subjects) experienced withdrawal when attempting to discontinue kratom with symptoms that included pain, muscle spasms, and insomnia. In a study following 239 male kratom users in Malaysia consuming between 40 and 240 mg of mitragynine per day, 89% indicated a previous attempt of discontinuing kratom consumption which resulted in withdrawal symptoms ranging from mild (65% of subjects) to moderate/severe (35% of subjects). In the same study, withdrawal symptoms ranged from physical symptoms such as nausea, diarrhea, and muscle spasms to psychological symptoms such as restlessness, anxiety, and anger but lasted less than 3 days for most subjects. However, the results from this study may be obfuscated by the occasional addition of other substances in the mitragynine preparation such as dextromethorphan and benzodiazepines, which could contribute to the withdrawal symptoms. In an animal study, mitragynine withdrawal symptoms were observed following 14 days of mitragynine i.p. injections in mice and included displays of anxiety, teeth chattering, and piloerection, all of which are characteristic signs of opioid withdrawal in mice and are comparable to morphine withdrawal symptoms.

Pharmacology

Pharmacodynamics 
Mitragynine acts on a variety of receptors in the CNS, most notably the mu, delta, and kappa opioid receptors. The nature of mitragynines' interaction with opioid receptors has yet to be fully classified with some reports suggesting partial agonist activity at the mu opioid receptor and others suggesting full agonist activity. Additionally, mitragynine is known to interact with delta and kappa opioid receptors as well, but these interactions remain ambiguous with some reports indicating mitragynine as a delta and kappa competitive antagonist and others as a full agonist of these receptors. In either case, mitragynine is reported to have lower affinity to delta and kappa receptors compared to mu receptors. Mitragynine is also known to interact with dopamine D2, adenosine, serotonin, and alpha-2 adrenergic receptors, though the significance of these interactions is not fully understood. Additionally, several reports of mitragynine pharmacology indicate potential biased agonism activity favoring G protein signaling pathways independent of beta arrestin recruitment, which was originally thought to be a primary component in reducing opioid induced respiratory depression. However, recent evidence suggests that low intrinsic efficacy at the mu opioid receptor is responsible for the improved side effect profile of mitragynine, as opposed to G protein bias.

Pharmacokinetics 

Pharmacokinetic analysis have largely taken place in live rodents as well as rodent and human microsomes. Owing to the heterogeneity of analysis and paucity of human experiments conducted thus far, the pharmacokinetic profile of mitragynine is not complete. However, initial pharmacokinetic studies in humans have yielded preliminary information. In a study of 10 healthy volunteers taking orally administered mitragynine from whole leaf preparations, mitragynine appeared to have a much longer half-life than typical opioid agonists (7–39 hours) and reached peak plasma concentration within 1 hour of administration.

Metabolism 

Mitragynine is primarily metabolized in the liver producing many metabolites during both phase I and phase II.

Phase I 
During phase I metabolism, mitragynine undergoes hydrolysis of the methylester group on C16 as well as o-demethylation of both methoxy groups on positions 9 and 17. Following this step, oxidation and reduction reactions convert aldehyde intermediates into alcohols and carboxylic acids. P450 metabolic enzymes are known to facilitate the phase I metabolism of mitragynine which reportedly has an inhibitory effect on multiple P450 enzymes, raising the possibility of adverse drug interactions.

Phase II 
During phase II metabolism, phase I metabolites undergo glucuronidation and sulfation to form multiple glucuronide and sulfate conjugates, which are then excreted via urine.

Toxicology 

Mitragynine toxicity in humans is largely unknown as studies examining mitragynine toxicity have thus far used animals which seem to have significant species specific differences in mitragynine tolerance. However, mitragynine toxicity in humans is rarely reported although specific examples of seizures and liver toxicity in kratom consumers have been reported. Due to P450 enzyme inhibition, the combination of mitragynine with other drugs poses a major concern regarding adverse reactions to mitragynine. As such, fatalities involving mitragynine tend to involve additional drugs including other opioids and cough suppressants. Post mortem toxicology screens indicate a wide range of mitragynine blood concentrations ranging from 10mcg/L to 4800mcg/L, making it difficult to calculate what constitutes a toxic dose. Such variations in blood concentrations are suggested to result from differences in the toxicology assays used and how long after overdose the assays were conducted.

Legality 
In the United States, kratom and its active ingredients are not scheduled under DEA guidelines. Despite the current legal status of the plant and its constituents, the legality of kratom has been turbulent in recent years. In August 2016 The DEA issued a report of intent stating that mitragynine and 7-hydroxymitragynine would undergo emergency scheduling and be placed under schedule 1 classification until further notice, making kratom strictly illegal and thus hindering research on its active constituents. Following this report, the DEA faced significant public and administrative opposition in the form of a White House petition signed by 140,000 citizens and a letter to the DEA administrator backed by 51 members of the House of Representatives resisting the proposed scheduling. This opposition led the DEA to withdraw its report of intent in October 2016, allowing for unencumbered research into the potential benefits and health risks associated with mitragynine and other alkaloids in the kratom plant. Kratom and its active constituents are unscheduled and legally sold in stores and online in the United States except for a small number of states. As of June 2019, the FDA continues to warn consumers not to use Kratom, while advocating for more research for a better understanding of Kratom's safety profile.

Research limitations 
Inconsistencies in dosing, purity, and concomitant drug use makes evaluating the effects of mitragynine in humans difficult. Conversely, animal studies control for such variability but offer limited translatable information relevant to humans. Experimental limitations aside, mitragynine has been found to interact with a variety of receptors, although the nature and extent of receptor interactions has yet to be fully characterized. Additionally, the toxicity of mitragynine and associated kratom alkaloids have yet to be fully determined in humans, nor has the risk of overdose. More studies are necessary to assess safety and potential therapeutic utility.

References 

Indoloquinolizines
Tryptamine alkaloids